The Indiana Mr. Football Award is an award given to the top high school American football player in the state of Indiana, presented annually by The Indianapolis Star.

Winners

Professional teams listed are teams known.

Schools with multiple winners

References

External links
Cavin, Curt, 'Carmel's Newton named Star's Indiana Mr. Football', Indianapolis Star, December 17, 2008 (includes list of past Indiana Mr. Football winners)

High school football in Indiana
Mr. Football awards
1992 establishments in Indiana